Lithium borohydride (LiBH4) is a borohydride and known in organic synthesis as a reducing agent for esters.  Although less common than the related sodium borohydride, the lithium salt offers some advantages, being a stronger reducing agent and highly soluble in ethers, whilst remaining safer to handle than lithium aluminium hydride.

Preparation
Lithium borohydride may be prepared by the metathesis reaction, which occurs upon ball-milling the more commonly available sodium borohydride and lithium bromide:
 NaBH4 + LiBr → NaBr + LiBH4

Alternatively, it may be synthesized by treating boron trifluoride with lithium hydride in diethyl ether:
 BF3 + 4 LiH → LiBH4 + 3 LiF

Reactions
Lithium borohydride is useful as a source of hydride (H–). It can react with a range of carbonyl substrates and other polarized carbon structures to form a hydrogen–carbon bond. It can also react with Brønsted–Lowry-acidic substances (sources of H+) to form hydrogen gas.

Reduction reactions
As a hydride reducing agent, lithium borohydride is stronger than sodium borohydride but weaker than lithium aluminium hydride. Unlike the sodium analog, it can reduce esters to alcohols, nitriles and primary amides to amines, and can open epoxides. The enhanced reactivity in many of these cases is attributed to the polarization of the carbonyl substrate by complexation to the lithium cation. Unlike the aluminium analog, it does not react with nitro groups, carbamic acids, alkyl halides, or secondary and tertiary amides.

Hydrogen generation
Lithium borohydride reacts with water to produce hydrogen. This reaction can be used for hydrogen generation.

Although this reaction is usually spontaneous and violent, somewhat-stable aqueous solutions of lithium borohydride can be prepared at low temperature if degassed, distilled water is used and exposure to oxygen is carefully avoided.

Energy storage

Lithium borohydride is renowned as one of the highest-energy-density chemical energy carriers. Although presently of no practical importance, the solid liberates 65 MJ/kg heat upon treatment with atmospheric oxygen. Since it has a density of 0.67 g/cm3, oxidation of liquid lithium borohydride gives 43 MJ/L. In comparison, gasoline gives 44 MJ/kg (or 35 MJ/L), while liquid hydrogen gives 120 MJ/kg (or 8.0 MJ/L). The high specific energy density of lithium borohydride has made it an attractive candidate to propose for automobile and rocket fuel, but despite the research and advocacy, it has not been used widely. As with all chemical-hydride-based energy carriers, lithium borohydride is very complex to recycle (i.e. recharge) and therefore suffers from a low energy conversion efficiency. While batteries such as lithium-ion carry an energy density of up to 0.72 MJ/kg and 2.0 MJ/L, their DC-to-DC conversion efficiency can be as high as 90%. In view of the complexity of recycling mechanisms for metal hydrides, such high energy-conversion efficiencies are not practical with present technology.

See also
Direct borohydride fuel cell

Notes

References

Borohydrides
Lithium salts
Reducing agents

el:Υδρίδιο του λιθίου